Lanmaoa carminipes is a fungus of the family Boletaceae native to the United States. First described officially in 1971 by mycologists Alexander H. Smith and Harry Delbert Thiers as a species of Boletus, it was transferred to the newly circumscribed genus Lanmaoa in 2015.

See also
List of North American boletes

References

External links
 

Boletaceae
Fungi described in 1971
Fungi of the United States
Taxa named by Alexander H. Smith
Taxa named by Harry Delbert Thiers
Fungi without expected TNC conservation status